Aaron Barlow (19 December 1951 - 11 January 2021) was a Cultural Studies scholar and a Professor of English at New York City College of Technology of the City University of New York.

Background 

Barlow was born in Durham, NC. He earned his B.A. at Beloit College and his M.A. and Ph.D. at The University of Iowa with a dissertation on Philip K. Dick.

Career 

Barlow specialized in the impact of technology on contemporary American culture. His series of 'blogosphere' books,  The Rise of the Blogosphere, Blogging America: The New Public Sphere, and Beyond the Blogosphere: Information and Its Children (with Robert Leston), explores the impact of New Media on American society and culture. He has also written two books related to film and the film industry, The DVD Revolution: Movies, Culture, and Technology and Quentin Tarantino: Life at the Extremes. More recently, he has moved into other areas, producing The Cult of Individualism: A History of an Enduring American Myth (2013) and The Depression Era: A Historical Exploration of Literature (2016) and has edited Doughboys on the Western Front: Memories of American Soldiers in the Great War (2016) as well as the two-volume set Star Power: The Impact of Branded Celebrity (2014).

In 2011, he edited a volume of essays written by Returned Peace Corps Volunteers called One Hand Does Not Catch a Buffalo   in celebration of the 50th anniversary of the Peace Corps, Barlow himself  having served  in Togo (88–90).  The book won a silver medal in the Travel Essay category of the 2011 Independent Publisher Book Awards    His academic career includes two years as a senior lecturer at the University of Ouagadougou in Burkina Faso as a Fulbright Fellow from 1985 to 1987. Since 2013, he has been Faculty Editor of Academe, the magazine of the American Association of University Professors (AAUP) and executive editor of the Academe blog. In 2016, he wrote regularly for Salon on political issues but stopped after the November election. His article "The Triumph of the Lie: How Honesty and Morality Died in Right-Wing Politics" appeared in the Summer 2017 issue of The Public Eye.

Selected publications 

¿Cuánto te Asusta el Caos? Política, Religión y Filosofía en la obra de Philip K. Dick 2003.  .
The DVD Revolution: Movies, Culture, and Technology. 2004. . 
The Rise of the Blogosphere. 2007. . 
Blogging America: The New Public Sphere. 2007. . 
Quentin Tarantino: Life at the Extremes. 2010.   .
One Hand Does Not Catch a Buffalo. Editor. 2011.   .
Beyond the Blogosphere: Information and Its Children with Robert Leston. 2011.  .
The Cult of Individualism: A History of an Enduring American Myth. 2012. .
Star Power: The Impact of Branded Celebrity. Editor. 2014. .978-1-61069-705-7
The Depression Era: A Historical Exploration of Literature. 2016. .
Doughboys on the Western Front: Memories of American Soldiers in the Great War. Editor. 2016. .
The 25 Sitcoms that Changed Television. Edited with Laura Westengard. 2018. .
Pop Goes the Decade: The Sixties. With Martin Kich. 2020. .
The Manhattan Project and the Dropping of the Atomic Bomb. Editor. 2020. .

References 

2020

Living people
1951 births
City University of New York faculty
Cultural academics
Beloit College alumni
University of Iowa alumni